"Jump Into the Fog" is a song by English rock band The Wombats from their second studio album, This Modern Glitch. The single was released in the UK on 23 January 2011 as a digital download in EP form, including three B-sides: "How I Miss Sally Bray", "Valentine", and "Addicted to the Cure". It debuted at No. 35 on the UK Singles Chart on 30 January 2011, marking the band's sixth top 40 hit.

Critical reception
Popped Music blog gave the song a positive review, stating:

Chart performance
"Jump Into the Fog" debuted on the UK Singles Chart at No. 35 on 30 January 2011, marking the band's sixth top 40 hit and the second single to reach the top 40 from This Modern Glitch. It was also their first song to enter the US Billboard Alternative Songs chart, with a peak position of number 15.

Track listing

Charts

Release history

References

2011 singles
The Wombats songs
Song recordings produced by Rich Costey
14th Floor Records singles
2011 songs
Songs written by Matthew Murphy
Songs written by Tord Øverland Knudsen
Songs written by Dan Haggis